Isawa may refer to:

Religion 
 Aissawa, a Sufi order in Morocco
 Isawa (Nigeria), an Islamic subgroup in Nigeria

Iwate Prefecture 
 Isawa District, Iwate, a district of Iwate Prefecture, Japan
 Isawa, Iwate, a former town, now part of Oshu City, Iwate Prefecture
 Isawa River, a river in Iwate Prefecture

Yamanashi Prefecture 
 Isawa, Yamanashi, a former town, now a part of Fuefuki City, Yamanashi Prefecture, Japan
 Isawa-onsen Station, a railway station on the JR Chūō Main Line in Yamanashi Prefecture